Glossodoris aeruginosa is a species of sea slug, a dorid nudibranch, a shell-less marine gastropod mollusk in the family Chromodorididae.

Distribution 
This species is found in the seas around eastern Australia and New Caledonia.

References

Chromodorididae
Gastropods described in 1995